Plantago ovata, known by many common names including blond plantain, desert Indianwheat, blond psyllium, and ispaghol, is native to the Mediterranean region and naturalized in central, eastern, and south Asia and North America.

It is a common source of psyllium, a type of dietary fiber. Psyllium seed husks are indigestible and are a source of soluble fiber which may be fermented into butyric acid – a short-chain fatty acid – by butyrate-producing bacteria.  Plantago ovata is the most popular source for commercial products containing psyllium.

Chemical constituents
 Psyllium

References

External links
Plants For A Future: Plantago ovata
Jepson Manual Treatment
Photo gallery

ovata
Flora of Asia
Flora of Western Asia
Medicinal plants
Flora of the United States
Flora of North Africa
Taxa named by Peter Forsskål